Aik Larki Aam Si (Eng: One Ordinary Girl) is a Pakistani television soap opera premiered on Hum TV on 19 June 2018. It is Produced by Momina Duraid under MD Productions. It stars Anmol Baloch and Babar Khan in leads while Jahanzeb Khan, Fawad Jalal and Ismat Iqbal in supporting roles.

Plot
Anmol is a poor girl lives with her widow mother and younger sister Nayab. She started doing a job in an office to overcome her family's financial issues as her younger sister was about to married in few months. One day on her way from office to home, she meets with an accident by Farhan's car. Farhan took her to the hospital and leaves before she wakes up.

On her sister's marriage, Farhan (who also attends marriage) confronts Anmol and started thinking that she was the same girl who was accidentally came in front of his car. Farhan starts to like Anmol. A few days after marriage, Farhan proposes to Anmol which she accepts. Then Anmol learns that Farhan is a fiancé of Subuhi (Nayab's sister-in-law). She decides to leave Farhan as it will affect the Nayab's relation with her in-laws.

Cast
Babar Khan as Farhan
Anmol Baloch as Anmol
Jahanzeb Khan as Minhaj
Fawad Jalal as Aazan; Farhan's brother
Aamna Malick as Faryal; Aazan's wife
Ismat Iqbal; Minhaj's mother
Annie Zaidi as Farhan's mother
Nawal Saeed as Nayab; Anmol's sister, Hamza's wife
Yasir Ali Khan as Hamza; Subuhi's brother, Nayab's husband
Hiba Aziz as Subuhi; Farhan's ex-fiancée
Munazzah Arif as Sadia; Anmol and Nayab's mother
Nargis Bhatti as Hamza and Subuhi's mother
Khushi Maheen as Aazan and Faryal's daughter
Faria Bukhari
Ayesha Khan

References

External links 
 Hum TV official website

Pakistani television soap operas
2018 Pakistani television series debuts
Hum TV original programming